The Certified Fraud Examiner (CFE) is a credential awarded by the Association of Certified Fraud Examiners (ACFE) since 1989. The ACFE association is a provider of anti-fraud training and education. Founded in 1988 by Dr. Joseph T Wells. The ACFE established and administers the Certified Fraud Examiner (CFE) credential. 

To become a Certified Fraud Examiner (CFE), one must meet the following requirements:
 Be an Associate Member of the ACFE in good standing
 Meet minimum academic and professional requirements (undergraduate degree and professional experience (Note: a combination of graduate or post-graduate education and experience can be used to increase eligibility, however most importantly a candidate must score 40 points or above based on eligibility criteria).
 Be of high moral character
 Agree to abide by the Bylaws and Code of Professional Ethics of the Association of Certified Fraud Examiners
 Pass the CFE Examination

Academic requirements

Generally, applicants for CFE certification must have a minimum of a bachelor's degree or equivalent from an institution of higher education. Two years of professional experience related to fraud can be substituted for each year of college.

Professional requirements

At the time of certification, at least two years of professional experience in a field either directly or indirectly related to the detection or deterrence of fraud is required. The ACFE recognizes the following areas as qualified professional experience:

 Accounting and auditing
 Criminology and sociology (sociology is acceptable only if it relates to fraud.)
 Fraud investigation
 Loss prevention (experience as a security guard or equivalent is not acceptable)
 Law relating to fraud

Other experience can qualify, but must be reviewed for applicability.

Moral character

The ACFE will require references attesting to one's character before granting the certificate.

Adhere to the Code of Ethics

Per the ACFE website, the code of ethics states that a Certified Fraud Examiner shall:

 Demonstrate a commitment to professionalism and diligence in his or her duties.
 Not engage in any illegal or unethical conduct, or any activity which constitutes a conflict of interest.
 Exhibit the highest level of integrity in the performance of all professional assignments and will accept only assignments for which there is reasonable expectation that the assignment will be completed with professional competence.
 Comply with lawful orders of the courts and testify to matters truthfully and without bias or prejudice.
 Obtain evidence or other documentation to establish a reasonable basis for any opinion rendered. No opinion shall be expressed regarding the guilt or innocence of any person or party.
 Not reveal any confidential information without proper authorization.
 Reveal all pertinent material matters discovered during the course of an examination.
 Continually strive to increase the competence and effectiveness of professional services performed under his or her direction.

Examination

The CFE Exam consists of 400 questions divided into four sections (100 questions each). Each exam section has a time limit of two hours with an optional five minute break. All four sections must be completed within a 60 days window.

The CFE Exam has the following four sections:

Fraud Prevention and Deterrence - Tests your knowledge of why people commit fraud and what can be done to prevent it. Topics include: Auditors' Fraud-Related Responsibilities, Corporate Governance, Ethics for Fraud Examiners, Fraud Prevention Programs, Fraud Risk Assessment, Fraud Risk Management, Management's Fraud-Related Responsibilities, Understanding Criminal Behavior, White-Collar Crime.
Financial Transactions and Fraud Schemes - This section tests your knowledge of the types of fraudulent financial transactions incurred in accounting records. Topics include: Accounting Concepts, Bribery and Corruption, Cash Receipts Schemes, Computer and Internet Fraud, Consumer Fraud, Contract and Procurement Fraud, Financial Institution Fraud, Financial Statement Fraud, Fraudulent Disbursements, Health Care Fraud, Identity Theft, Insurance Fraud, Inventory and Other Assets, Payment Fraud, Theft of Data and Intellectual Property.
Investigation - Topics include: Analyzing Documents, Covert Examinations, Data Analysis and Reporting Tools, Digital Forensics, Interview Theory and Application, Interviewing Suspects and Signed Statements, Planning and Conducting a Fraud Examination, Report Writing, Sources of Information, Tracing Illicit Transactions.
Law - This section ensures that you are familiar with the many legal ramifications of conducting fraud examinations, including criminal and civil law, rules of evidence, rights of the accused and accuser and expert witness matters. Topics include: Bankruptcy (Insolvency) Fraud, Basic Principles of Evidence, Individual Rights During Examinations, Law Related to Fraud, Money Laundering, Overview of the Legal System, Securities Fraud, Tax Fraud, Testifying, The Civil Justice System, The Criminal Justice System.

Notable CFEs
Cynthia Cooper, whistleblower of the WorldCom accounting scandal
Joseph Gutheinz, Omniplan Task Force Leader, largest count conviction in NASA history
Harry Markopolos, whistleblower of the Bernard Madoff scandal
David P. Weber, former U.S. Securities and Exchange Commission (SEC) Chief Investigator, and whistleblower.
Joseph T. Wells, founder and chairman of the Association of Certified Fraud Examiners

References

External links
Association of Certified Fraud Examiners

Accounting qualifications
Professional titles and certifications
Fraud